Scantraxx Italy is an Italian record label and a sublabel of Scantraxx records. It is owned by Davide Cardilli, who releases his music as Davide Sonar. It focuses on releases by Italian Scantraxx artists.

References 

Italian record labels
Record labels established in 2007